The Stillwater River is a river in New Zealand, flowing into Caswell Sound, Fiordland.

See also
List of rivers of New Zealand

References

Rivers of Fiordland